This list is of the Historic Sites of Japan located within the Prefecture of Nagasaki.

National Historic Sites
As of 1 July 2019, thirty-two Sites have been designated as being of national significance (including two *Special Historic Sites).

Prefectural Historic Sites
As of 1 May 2019, ninety-three Sites have been designated as being of prefectural importance.

Municipal Historic Sites
As of 1 May 2018, a further three hundred and nineteen Sites have been designated as being of municipal importance.

See also
 Cultural Properties of Japan
 Hizen Province
 Tsushima Province
 Iki Province
 List of Places of Scenic Beauty of Japan (Nagasaki)
 List of Cultural Properties of Japan - paintings (Nagasaki)
 Nagasaki Museum of History and Culture

References

External links
  Cultural Properties in Nagasaki Prefecture
  Ruins Dictionary - Nagasaki Prefecture

Nagasaki Prefecture
 Nagasaki